Madras to Pondicherry is a 1966 Indian Tamil-language road film, directed by Thirumalai–Mahalingam and written by Usilai Somanathan. The film stars Ravichandran and Kalpana. It was released on 16 December 1966, became a commercial success, and was remade in Hindi as Bombay to Goa (1972). This in turn went on to inspire the 2004 Marathi film Navra Maza Navsacha, which was also remade in Kannada in 2007 as Ekadantha.

Plot 

Mala, an aspiring film actress, leaves home because of her interest in this which is kindled by a group of thugs. One of them shoots a member of his gang, which she witnesses. To escape them, she jumps onto a running bus going from Madras to Pondicherry. The thugs hire an assassin to board the bus Mala is in to kill her. However, a man named Baskar also gets into the bus. Realising that Mala is in danger, he voluntarily saves her and ends up falling in love with her. Ultimately, it is revealed that Baskar is Mala's prospective bridegroom whom she tried to avoid by leaving her home.

Cast 
 Ravichandran as Baskar
Kalpana as Mala
 Nagesh as the bus conductor
 Manorama as a Brahmin woman
 A. Karunanidhi as the bus driver
Pakoda Kadhar as Gopu / the Brahmin couple's son
A. Veerappan as a Brahmin man
V. K. Ramasamy as street magicians
V. S. Raghavan as Mala's father
P. K. Saraswathi as Mala's mother
O. A. K. Thevar as Hotel owner
Karikol Raju as Bhagavathar
K. K. Soundar as Mad mother's son
A. K. Veerasami as Baskar's father
Thayir Vadai Desikan as Bus passenger
Kallapart Natarajan as Mala's love interest
 K.S. Angamuthu as Bus passenger
Gundu Karuppaiah as Bus passenger

Production 
Madras to Pondicherry was directed by the duo Thirumalai–Mahalingam, written by Usilai Somanathan, and produced under the banner Sri Venkateswara Cinetone by four people: T. S. Adhinarayanan, P. M. Nachimuthu, S. Sivaraman and G. K. Selvaraj. It was among the earliest road films in Tamil cinema.

Soundtrack 
The music was composed by T. K. Ramamoorthy and the lyrics were written by Alangudi Somu, Panchu Arunachalam, Thanjai Vaanan and Namakkal Varadarajan.

Release and reception 
Madras to Pondicherry was released on 16 December 1966. Kalki criticised the film for its story. Despite this, it became a commercial success.

Remakes 
Madras to Pondicherry was remade in Hindi as Bombay to Goa in 1972. This in turn went on to inspire the 2004 Marathi film Navra Maza Navsacha, which was also remade in Kannada in 2007 as Ekadantha.

References

External links 
 

1960s comedy thriller films
1960s Tamil-language films
1966 comedy films
1966 films
Films scored by T. K. Ramamoorthy
Films set in Chennai
Films shot in Chennai
Films shot in Puducherry
Indian black-and-white films
Indian comedy road movies
Indian comedy thriller films
Tamil films remade in other languages